Stig Egon Frid (born 1957) is a Swedish politician and former member of the Riksdag, the national legislature. A member of the Left Party, he represented Västra Götaland County East between October 2006 and October 2010.

References

1957 births
Living people
Members of the Riksdag 2006–2010
Members of the Riksdag from the Left Party (Sweden)